Kim Mi-rae (born 7 April 2001) is a North Korean diver. She competed in the women's synchronized ten metre platform event at the 2016 Summer Olympics.

References

2001 births
Living people
North Korean female divers
Olympic divers of North Korea
Divers at the 2016 Summer Olympics
Place of birth missing (living people)
World Aquatics Championships medalists in diving
Asian Games medalists in diving
Divers at the 2018 Asian Games
Asian Games silver medalists for North Korea
Asian Games bronze medalists for North Korea
Medalists at the 2018 Asian Games
21st-century North Korean women